Disappointment is the feeling of dissatisfaction that follows the failure of expectations to manifest.

Disappointment may also refer to:

 Camp Disappointment, the northernmost campsite of the Lewis and Clark expedition
 Disappointment Creek (Utukok River), a river in North Slope Borough, Alaska
 Disappointment Island, one of seven uninhabited islands of the archipelago Auckland Islands
 Disappointment Islands, a small group of coral atolls
 Disappointment Mountain, a peak in the Sawtooth Mountains, Minnesota
 Disappointment Peak (Wyoming), a peak in the Teton Range
 Mount Disappointment (California), a mountain in the San Gabriel Mountains
 Mount Disappointment (Australia) in Victoria, Australia
 "Disappointment", a song by The Cranberries from No Need to Argue

See also

 Cape Disappointment (disambiguation)
 Disappointed (disambiguation)
 Great Disappointment
 The Disappointment, a ballad opera performed in 1762 written by an unknown author under the pseudonym "Andrew Barton"
 "The Disappointment" (Aphra Behn), a poem by Aphra Behn